Jesper Rewitz Rasmussen (born 4 January 1992) is a Danish former professional footballer who played as a midfielder.

Career
Coming through the youth ranks of Haderslev FK, he struggled with injuries through his career. In 2009, he transferred to Esbjerg, and he signed his first professional contract with the club in June 2012.

He made his league debut in a 1-2 home loss against AaB 27 June 2013, coming on as a substitute in the 80th minute. In his second league appearance, in an away match against Brøndby IF, he came on as a substitute for Jakob Ankersen at half time. Rasmussen scored both goals in a game that saw Esbjerg win 0-2.

After two loan spells at Vejle Boldklub, Rasmussen retired from professional football in 2016 after being released by Esbjerg.

References

External links
Danish national team profile

Profile at Vejle BK

1992 births
Living people
Danish men's footballers
Denmark youth international footballers
People from Esbjerg
Danish Superliga players
Danish 1st Division players
Esbjerg fB players
Vejle Boldklub players
Association football midfielders
Sportspeople from the Region of Southern Denmark